The 2009–10 CHL Oakley Awards are the way the Central Hockey League denotes its players of the week and players of the month of the 2009–10 season.

Weekly

Monthly

References

Oakley Awards